Hefele is a German surname. Notable people with the surname include:

Anna-Maria Hefele, German singer
Karl Josef von Hefele (1809–1893), German Catholic bishop and theologian 
Michael Hefele (born 1990), German footballer

German-language surnames